Digital Universe Atlas is a free open source software planetarium application, available under the terms of the Illinois Open Source License, and running on Linux, Windows, macOS (10.5 and above), AmigaOS 4, and IRIX.

It is a standalone 4-dimensional space visualization application built on the programmable Partiview data visualization engine designed by Stuart Levy of the National Center for Supercomputing Applications (NCSA) as an adjunct of the NCSA's Virtual Director virtual choreography project.  The Virtual Universe Atlas project was launched by the American Museum of Natural History's Hayden Planetarium with significant programming support from the National Aeronautics and Space Administration as well as Stuart Levy. The database draws on the National Virtual Observatory.

Along with Celestia and Orbiter, and unlike most other planetarium applications, Digital Universe shares the capacity to visualize space from points outside Earth. Building on work by Japan's RIKEN, its planet renderings and zoom visualizations can match or exceed Celestia and Orbiter.  Unlike Celestia and Orbiter, highly accurate visualization from distances beyond the Milky Way galaxy is integral to the software and the datasets.  This allows for unrivaled flexibility in plotting itineraries that reveal true distances and configurations of objects in the observable sky.  It therefore improves understanding of the surroundings of the solar system in terms of observer-neutral celestial coordinate systems—systems that are neither geocentric nor heliocentric—such as the galactic coordinate system and supergalactic coordinate system.

The Digital Universe Atlas has spun off a commercial-grade planetarium platform from SCISS called Uniview that was featured in the White House star party on October 7, 2009. The Atlas database and Partiview interface is compatible with professional planetarium software such as Evans & Sutherland's Digistar and Sky-Skan's DigitalSky 2.

The Digital Universe is now a critical component of the OpenSpace open source interactive data visualization software suite. In 2014, a NASA grant (supported by the NASA Science Mission Directorate in response to NASA Cooperative Agreement Number (CAN) NNH15ZDA004C, Amendment 1) was awarded to the American Museum of Natural History for the development of the OpenSpace project, to utilize the latest data visualization techniques and graphics card technologies for rapid data throughput. OpenSpace and its Digital Universe datasets work on all operating systems and is available for free download.

See also

Space flight simulation game
List of space flight simulation games
Planetarium software
List of observatory software

References

External links
 Official Website
 OpenSpace website
 Partiview
 Partiview user's guide
 Peter Teubern & Stuart Levy, Partiview reference manual
 Partiview mailing list
 University of Chicago Department of Astronomy & Astrophysics, "Partiview for Developers"
 Selden Ball, "Planets for Partiview"
 Partiview on GeoWalls
 University of Chicago Department of Astronomy & Astrophysics, "Downloads," other visualization plug-ins for Partiview
 Uniview
 Evans & Sutherland Digistar
 Sky-Skan DigitalSky 
 "The Known Universe" video simulation, American Museum of Natural History, December 15, 2009, using the DUA database and visualized using UniView
 Brian Abbott, Carter Emmart, and Ryan Wyatt, "Virtual Universe," Natural History, April 2004
 "3-D Tour Puts Stars within Reach," Wired Magazine, June 3, 2003
 Slashdot discussion, July 25, 2002
 TED 2010 - A 3D atlas of the universe - Carter Emmart

AmigaOS 4 software
Astronomy software
Free astronomy software
Planetarium software for Linux
Science software for macOS
Science software for Windows
Software using the NCSA license